Fascism in South America is an assortment of political parties and movements modelled on fascism. Although originating and primarily associated with Europe, the ideology crossed the Atlantic Ocean between the world wars and had an influence on South American politics. The original Italian fascism had deep impact in the region. Although the ideas of Falangism probably had the deepest impact in South America, largely due to Hispanidad, more generic fascism was also an important factor in regional politics.

History 
The original Italian fascism had deep impact in the region: in 1934, at least six political parties in Latin America were based on Italy's National Fascist Party (including the Mexican goldshirts in North America, based on the Italian blackshirts); fascist corporatism served as a model for economic policies; several rulers, such as the first Argentinian dictators of the Infamous Decade and Getulio Vargas in the earlier part of the Vargas Era, were inspired by Benito Mussolini and his methods; and the Italian fascist regime took an active role in spreading fascist propaganda, also through Italian immigrants in the continent.

Argentina
During the 1920s former socialist Leopoldo Lugones became a supporter of fascism and from this basis a coterie of pro-fascist intellectuals grew. Including amongst its number Juan Carulla, Ernesto Palacio, Manuel Gálvez, Carlos Ibarguren, Roberto de Laferrere, Mario Amadeo and the brothers Rodolfo and Julio Irazusta, they gathered around the journal La Nueva Republica and expressed ideas reminiscent of those of Charles Maurras. They grouped together under the name ADUNA (Afirmación de Una Nueva Argentina) although this was a loose alliance that struggled for support outside the intellectual elements of society. They did however work closely with the regime of José Félix Uriburu, which initially attempted to introduce corporatism inspired by Benito Mussolini before giving way to the Infamous Decade.

This group however despite openly expressing their enthusiasm for fascism, retained links to the established conservative political elements with organised fascism being led by Thomist writer Nimio de Anquín, whose Unión Nacional Fascista was active in various forms from the late 1920s until 1939. His fellow Thomist Julio Meinvielle was also active in support of fascism and distilled much of the anti-Semitism of Nazism as well. He became the theological force behind the militant Tacuara Nationalist Movement.

Argentina came under the rule of Juan Perón in 1946 and he is sometimes characterised as a fascist. However the description of Peronism as fascist has proven controversial in academic circles.

Bolivia
The governments of David Toro and Germán Busch were vaguely committed to corporatism, ultra-nationalism and national syndicalism but they suffered from a lack of coherence in their ideas. The ideas were taken up by the Revolutionary Nationalist Movement (MNR), which was open about its ideological debt to fascism and which joined the military in a pro-Axis powers government under Gualberto Villarroel in 1943. After the war the MNR largely turned away from its fascist roots and when Víctor Paz Estenssoro came to power as MNR leader in a 1952 coup any vestiges of fascism had been abandoned.

From an initially more oppositional stance Óscar Únzaga's Bolivian Socialist Falange was an important group in the 1930s that initially sought to use the ideas of José Antonio Primo de Rivera in Bolivia but, like the MNR, over time it de-emphasised its links to fascism.

Brazil
Fascism first appeared in Brazil in 1922 with the foundation of the Legião do Cruzeiro do Sul and within ten years this had been followed by the Legião de Outubro, the Partido Nacional Sindicalista, the Partido Fascista Nacional, the Legião Cearense do Trabalho, the Partido Nacionalista of São Paulo, the Partido Nacional Regenerador, and the Partido Socialista Brasileiro, all minor groups that espoused some form of fascism However one of the most important fascist movements on the continent was Brazilian Integralism, which shared a heritage with both Italian fascism and Integralismo Lusitano. At its peak the Ação Integralista Brasileira, led by Plínio Salgado, claimed as many as 200,000 members although following coup attempts it faced a crackdown from the Estado Novo of Getúlio Vargas in 1937. Like the Portuguese Estado Novo that influenced it, Vargas' regime borrowed from fascism without fully endorsing it and in the end repressed those who advocated full fascism.

There were also Italian and German fascist organizations acting through both communities, notably in the Southeastern and Southern regions, where are located the majority of the population with those origins, between the 1920s and the end of the war. For the Italian ones, both immigrants and their descendants were accepted, like in the "Fascio di Sao Paolo" institution (see below), one of the main organizations of the Italian Fascism in Brazil.

The Fascio di Sao Paolo was formed in March 1923, approximately 6 months after the fascists took power in Italy, with huge success among the Italians of the city, what was confirmed by the quickly widespread to others cities and Italian communities. In November 1931, a branch of the Opera Nazionale Dopolavoro, which had existed in Italy since 1925, was founded in São Paulo, and put under control of the Fascio di Sao Paulo, responsible to spread the fascist doctrine among the popular classes. Another important institution at that time was the Circolo Italiano di Sao Paolo, formed in 1910 and continuing today, which aimed to preserve and disseminate Italian culture to Italo-Brazilians and Brazilians in general. In the middle 1920s, the fascist doctrine began to infiltrate this community, by the influence of the 'March on Rome veteran' Serafino Mazzolini, Italian consul to Brazil.

The three Italian institutions referred to, and several more, along with their members, were spied on, persecuted, and sometimes even closed (and some members arrested; one of them, Cesar Rivelli, was expelled of the country) by the Estado Novo regime under the allegation of "conspiring against the Brazilian State" by orders of the fascist government in Italy. After the Brazilian declaration of war against the Axis powers in 1942, for example, the traditional Dante Alighieri school of São Paulo, in that time particularly frequented by students of Italian background, had to change its name to "Colégio Visconde de São Leopoldo", returning to the formal name only after the war was over.

Chile
Under the direction of Carlos Keller and Jorge González von Marées the National Socialist Movement of Chile took up position similar to those of Adolf Hitler following its formation in 1932, albeit heavily criticizing his racial principles. Later adopting a more domestic version of fascism it attempted a coup in 1938 and faded after the attempt failed, adopting the name Vanguardia Popular Socialista before disbanding in 1941. In 1940 some ex-members founded the corporatist Movimiento Nacionalista de Chile and members of this latter group were instrumental in the foundation of Fatherland and Liberty in 1970.

The regime of Augusto Pinochet that ruled from 1974 to 1990, which Fatherland and Liberty had helped to bring about had some influences from falangismo but it took a more conservative liberal direction during the 1980s. The government is sometimes characterised as fascist although this has been the subject of much debate in academic circles.

Colombia
Links were alleged between Nazi Germany and Laureano Gómez's newspaper El Siglo during the 1930s and 1940s, although Colombia has generally had little fascist activity in its history outside of the German community.

Ecuador
Although the Alianza Revolucionaria Nacionalista Ecuatoriana (ARNE) was founded in 1948, it still looked to fascism for its inspiration. The group failed to make a major impact, as it was kept in check by the populism of José María Velasco Ibarra. Frequently attending workers meetings and rallies in an effort to provoke violence with leftist groups, the ARNE was little more than a wing of the Conservative Party, one of the country's two leading political groups.

Falkland Islands
Although the Falkland Islands has never had a fascist movement, its status as a British overseas territory meant that it was used to house some British Union of Fascists members detained under Defence Regulation 18B during the Second World War. The most high profile of these was Jeffrey Hamm who was interned in the hull of a ship in Port Stanley harbour.

The status of the Falklands was also an important issue for the ADUNA faction in Argentina, notably the Irazusta brothers who wrote extensively on their desire to return the islands to Argentine sovereignty.

Paraguay
The Febrerista movement, active during the 1930s, demonstrated some support for fascism by seeking revolutionary change, endorsing strong nationalism and seeking to, at least in part, introduce corporatism. However their revolutionary, Rafael Franco-led government proved decidedly non-radical during its brief tenure and the Febreristas have since regrouped as the Revolutionary Febrerista Party, a socialist party with no connection to fascism.

Peru
The Unión Revolucionaria was initially founded by Luis Miguel Sánchez Cerro in 1931 as the state party of his dictatorship. However, following his 1933 assassination the group came under the leadership of Raúl Ferrero Rebagliati who sought to mobilise mass support and even set up a Blackshirt movement in imitation of the Italian model. A heavy defeat in the 1944 elections shook confidence however and the movement faded.
 	
Following the collapse of Reblagiati's movement the main outlet for fascism became the Peruvian Fascist Brotherhood, formed by ex-Prime Minister José de la Riva-Agüero y Osma. The group initially enjoyed some prestige although it faded into the background after Peru entered the Second World War on the side of the Allies whilst the group's credibility was damaged by its leader becoming increasingly eccentric in his personal behaviour.

The Alianza Popular Revolucionaria Americana (APRA) was originally a left-wing nationalist party founded in 1924. During the 1930s it developed certain similarities with fascism, such as calling for a new national community and founding a small paramilitary wing, but then very quickly changed course and emerged as a mainstream social democratic party.

Uruguay
The academic Hugo Fernández Artucio wrote the book Nazis in Uruguay in 1940 and campaigned against German fifth column activity in the country during the war. This included a plot to take Uruguay as a German colony which saw 12 people arrested for conspiracy and a ban placed on the Nazi Party within the country's German community. There was, however, little or no domestic fascist activity in Uruguay.

Venezuela

Beyond some minor Falangist activity Venezuela has had little fascist activity to speak of. However amongst the country's German population the Groupo Regional de Venezuela del Partido Nazi was formed before the Second World War by Arnold Margerie. The group was behind a number of cultural front groups active amongst Venezuela's Germans.

See also
 Fascism in Africa
 Fascism in Asia
 Fascism in Europe
 Fascism in North America
 Fascism in the Americas

References

 
Politics of South America